Charles Walters (1911–1982) was an American film director and choreographer.

Charles Walters may also refer to:

Charles Walters (footballer) (fl. 1899), English footballer
Charles Walters Jr. (1926–2009), American family farm advocate
Charles L. Walters (1862–1894), American politician in New Jersey